A. Laubin, Inc. is an American maker of oboes and English horns, located in Peekskill, New York. The first Laubin oboe was made in 1931 by Alfred Laubin, a performing musician who was dissatisfied with the quality of instruments available at the time.  The creation of oboes began as a home project, but soon Mr. Laubin was able to make oboes which met the demands of his own playing career.  These instruments impressed his professional oboist friends, many of whom began playing Laubin's oboes during this time.  Eventually, oboe-making developed into a full-time occupation, beginning in the mid-1950s. In 1956, Alfred's eldest son Paul Laubin joined the business, doing repair work and eventually learning every aspect of oboe-making before taking over the business when Alfred died in 1976.

Today, Paul Laubin (b. Dec. 14, 1932; d. While other oboe manufacturers have moved to a largely automated process, using computerized milling machines and standardized parts, Laubin still does everything essentially by hand, using belt-driven lathes, drills, and hand tools.

In spite of their relative scarcity, Laubin oboes are played by a significant number of highly regarded oboists, including some in the New York Philharmonic, St. Louis Symphony Orchestra and the Montreal Symphony Orchestra.

References

External links
Laubin official website
NAMM Oral History interview with Paul Laubin October 11, 2013 ă

Year of birth missing
Oboe manufacturing companies
Companies based in Westchester County, New York
Musical instrument manufacturing companies of the United States
Manufacturing companies based in New York (state)